"She Ain't in It" is a song written by Clint Daniels and Wynn Varble, and recorded by American country music artist Jon Pardi. It is the fourth single from his second album California Sunrise (2016). The song, telling of a brokenhearted man, was accompanied by a music video directed by Jim Wright. It is Pardi's eighth charted single, reaching numbers 21 and 23 on both the Billboard Country Airplay and Hot Country Songs charts respectively. It was certified Gold by the Recording Industry Association of America (RIAA), denoting sales of over 500,000 units in the United States. The song also charted in Canada, peaking at number 31 on the Canada Country chart.

Content
An uncredited review in Taste of Country described the song as "a slow, fiddle and steel powered love-lost song that finds the typically plucky 31-year-old hurting." It is about a man who is "ready to start getting back into the swing of things, but still hurting from a breakup that he hasn't gotten over." The song was originally on hold for George Strait, but once it became available to Pardi, he chose to record it.

Music video
The music video, directed by Jim Wright, was filmed in black-and-white. It features the male narrator working on a ranch, interspersed with shots of the man's former lover who has moved to New York City.

Live performance
On March 8 2018, Pardi first performed the song live as a medley with "Heartache on the Dance Floor" on Jimmy Kimmel Live!.

Chart performance

Weekly charts

Year-end charts

Certifications

References

2016 songs
2017 singles
Jon Pardi songs
Capitol Records Nashville singles
Black-and-white music videos
Songs written by Clint Daniels
Songs written by Wynn Varble